Cephalodina capito is a species of beetle in the family Cerambycidae. It was described by Bates in 1866. It is known from Costa Rica and Panama.

References

Hemilophini
Beetles described in 1866